Lady Catherine de Bourgh (née Fitzwilliam;) is a character in the 1813 novel Pride and Prejudice by Jane Austen. According to Janet Todd, Lady Catherine can be seen as a foil to the novel's protagonist Elizabeth Bennet.

Family

Lady Catherine was the sister of Lady Anne Darcy, mother of Mr. Fitzwilliam Darcy and Georgiana Darcy. The sisters were the daughters of an earl and their brother is the sitting earl during the events of the novel. Thus she and her sister are always styled as Lady Catherine and Lady Anne, regardless of marriage.
 
Lady Catherine is the widow of Sir Lewis de Bourgh. If she were not noble, she would be styled as Lady de Bourgh, since her husband was a knight. The couple had a single daughter, Anne de Bourgh. Lady Catherine desired to marry her daughter to Mr. Darcy. 

At the end of the novel, Lady Catherine becomes the aunt-in-law of Elizabeth Bennet after Elizabeth marries Mr. Darcy. She considers that Mr. Darcy is marrying someone much below him.

Rosings Park

Rosings is the residence of Lady Catherine de Bourgh as well as her daughter Anne de Bourgh. It is noted many times within the novel as being a luxurious house with many fine fittings. One such feature is a chimney piece in the second drawing room that is worth £800 as Mr. Collins so proudly states. The stateliness and grandeur of Rosings Park underline the side of Mr. Darcy's background that impresses Elizabeth, although she refuses to be overawed by it.

Depictions in film and television

Film

Television

References

Pride and Prejudice characters
Literary characters introduced in 1813
Fictional lords and ladies